Şükrü (Turkish from ) may refer to:

People

Given name
Şükrü Enis Regü (1922-1974), Turkish poet
Şükrü Halûk Akalın (born 1956), Turkish academic
Şükrü Gülesin (1922–1977), Turkish football player and sports journalist
Şükrü Sina Gürel (born 1950), Turkish diplomat, Turkish foreign minister in mid-2002
Şükrü Kaya (1883–1959), Ottoman civil servant and Turkish politician
Şükrü Âli Ögel (1886–1973), Turkish military officer, director of the Turkish governmental intelligence agency
Şükrü Saracoğlu (1887–1953), 6th Prime Minister of Republic of Turkey

Middle name
M. Şükrü Hanioğlu, Turkish professor of late Ottoman history in the Department of Near Eastern Studies at Princeton University

See also
 Shukri

Turkish masculine given names